Burnupia crassistriata is a species of small freshwater snail or limpet, an aquatic gastropod mollusk which was traditionally placed in the family Planorbidae, the ram's horn snails and their allies.

It was previously listed as a vulnerable species in the IUCN Red List of Threatened Species (2004).

Distribution 
This species of freshwater limpet is endemic to Kenya. Its natural habitat is rivers. It is threatened by habitat loss.

References

Planorbidae
Endemic molluscs of Kenya
Gastropods described in 1911
Taxonomy articles created by Polbot